"Waiting for Your Love" is a song by American pop and rock band Toto from their 1982 album Toto IV. In 1983, it was released as a single, peaking at number 73 on the Billboard Hot 100 chart.

Composition
The song was written by vocalist Bobby Kimball and keyboardist David Paich and is performed in the key of A-flat major.

Kimball said in an interview that he "wrote it in the '70s and originally called it "'You Got Me'".

Reception
Somethingelsereviews.com wrote that Bobby Kimball gave a fantastic lead vocal performance in the song, and that "Waiting for Your Love" had an infectious, danceable, back beat.

Personnel
Bobby Kimball – vocals
David Hungate – bass guitar
David Paich – synthesizers, background vocals
Steve Lukather – guitar, background vocals
Steve Porcaro – synthesizers
Jeff Porcaro – drums, percussion

References

1982 songs
1983 singles
Toto (band) songs
Songs written by David Paich